Vogtlandkreis is an electoral constituency (German: Wahlkreis) represented in the Bundestag. It elects one member via first-past-the-post voting. Under the current constituency numbering system, it is designated as constituency 166. It is located in southwestern Saxony, comprising the Vogtlandkreis district.

Vogtlandkreis was created for the inaugural 1990 federal election after German reunification. Since 2017, it has been represented by Yvonne Magwas of the Christian Democratic Union (CDU).

Geography
Vogtlandkreis is located in southwestern Saxony. As of the 2021 federal election, it is coterminous with the Vogtlandkreis district.

History
Vogtlandkreis was created after German reunification in 1990, then known as Reichenbach – Plauen – Auerbach – Oelsnitz. In the 2002 and 2005 elections, it was named Vogtland – Plauen. It acquired its current name in the 2009 election. In the 1990 through 1998 elections, it was constituency 328 in the numbering system. In the 2002 and 2005 elections, it was number 168. In the 2009 election, it was number 167. Since 2013, it has been number 166.

Originally, the constituency comprised the independent city of Plauen and the districts of Reichenbach, Landkreis Plauen, Auerbach, and Oelsnitz. In the 2002 and 2005 elections, it comprised the independent city of Plauen and the Vogtlandkreis district. It acquired its current borders in the 2009 election.

Members
The constituency was first represented by Bertram Wieczorek of the Christian Democratic Union (CDU) from 1990 to 1994, followed by Rudolf Braun until 1998. Rolf Schwanitz of the Social Democratic Party (SPD) won the constituency in 1998. Robert Hochbaum regained it for the CDU in 2002 and served until 2017. Yvonne Magwas of the CDU was elected in 2017 and re-elected in 2021.

Election results

2021 election

2017 election

2013 election

2009 election

References

Federal electoral districts in Saxony
1990 establishments in Germany
Constituencies established in 1990
Vogtlandkreis